SQL Insertion may refer to:

 SQL insertion attack
 Insert (SQL), statement in SQL